The Office of Foreign Relief and Rehabilitation Operations (OFRRO) was a short-lived organization created during World War II in the United States Department of State. 
It existed between December 1942 and November 1943, when it was replaced by the United Nations Relief and Rehabilitation Administration (UNRRA).

History

The OFRRO was established in December 1942.
It was one of the organizations set up to provide relief to populations suffering from the effects of the war, others being the British Committee on Surpluses, the Inter-Allied Committee on Post-War Requirements, established in September 1941 to estimate the extent of postwar needs and the Middle East Relief and Refugee Administration, which the British set up to operate refugee camps.
President Franklin D. Roosevelt announced on 21 November 1942 that the OFRRO was being established with Herbert H. Lehman, the governor of New York State, as its director.
Lehman took office on 4 December 1942.
Roosevelt laid out the objectives in a letter of 11 December 1942, in which he wrote:

The OFRRO took over the Department of State staff working on relief and rehabilitation problems.
It also took over leadership of five inter-departmental committees on Food Relief, Agricultural Rehabilitation, Clothing Requirements and Supply, Health and Medical Requirements and Supply and Essential Services and Industries.
In 1943 Selskar Gunn of the Rockefeller Foundation was secretary of Governor Lehman's committee to organize the OFRRO, creating plans that were used in the operations of  its successor, the United Nations Relief and Rehabilitation Administration (UNRRA).

Successor

On 17 June 1943 Lehman outlined the future tasks of the UNRRA, which the United Nations wanted to establish to organize relief, rehabilitation and supplies.
On 9 November 1943 the 44 United and Associated Nations gathered at the White House to sign an agreement creating the United Nations Relief and Rehabilitation Administration (UNRRA), which took over from the earlier organizations.
Lehman was the first head of the UNNRA.

Notes

Sources

  

Organizations established in 1942
Organizations disestablished in 1943
Displaced persons camps in the aftermath of World War II
United States and the United Nations